USS Badger was an auxiliary cruiser of the United States Navy, the first U.S. Navy ship named after the burrowing mammal. Badger was sold to the War Department in April 1900 to serve as the U.S. Army Transport Lawton.

She was built in 1889 by Delaware River Iron Ship Building and Engine Works, Chester, Pennsylvania, as merchant ship Yumuri, purchased for use in the Spanish–American War on 19 April 1898 and converted to an auxiliary cruiser at New York Navy Yard, then commissioned on 25 April 1898, Commander A. S. Snow in command; and joined the North Patrol Squadron.

Service history
From 1 July to 18 August 1898, Badger served on the blockade of Cuba. On 26 July 1898, off the Dry Tortugas, she seized a Spanish tug with two vessels in tow, each with a quarantine flag hoisted. They were given medical assistance, provisioned, and kept in port until 3 August when a prize crew was put aboard the tug to sail her to New York. The other two vessels with 399 prisoners of war were sent to Havana.

Badger left Guantánamo Bay on 18 August 1898 with a contingent of Army troops, landing them at Montauk Point, New York, 24 August. Badger remained on the east coast until 26 December 1898 when she sailed to the Pacific, arriving at San Francisco 15 April 1899. From there she carried the Joint High Commission to Samoa (26 April – 13 May 1899) and then cruised in Samoan waters. Following her return to Mare Island Navy Yard on 14 August 1899, she cruised along the Pacific coast until 6 October 1899 with the Oregon and California Naval Militia. Decommissioned on 31 October 1899, Badger was transferred to the War Department on 7 April 1900, where she was renamed Lawton and used as an army transport.

USAT Lawton, was fitted for troop and supply service to Alaska with a capacity for 700 passengers. In June 1900 the ship was engaged in returning destitute citizens from Alaska to the United States. Over the next fiscal year (1 July 1900—30 June 1901) Lawton was also engaged in transport to China and interisland service in the Philippines. The ship transported troops to China in July 1900 in response to the Boxer Rebellion.

References

External links
 Log Book of USS Badger by John W. Klinger, 1899
 Navy photographs of Badger

Ships of the Ward Line
Transport ships of the United States Army
1889 ships
Ships built by the Delaware River Iron Ship Building and Engine Works
Auxiliary cruisers of the United States Navy